The United Front of Arevalist Parties (Frente Unido de Partidos Arevalistas, FUPA) was a Guatemalan political electoral front. The principal partners in the front were Popular Liberation (PL) and the National Renovation Party (PRN). The Front was formed in November 1944. It disbanded after the Presidential elections of December 1944.

References

Political party alliances in Guatemala
Political parties established in 1944
Guatemalan Revolution